Frank Norman (9 June 1930 – 23 December 1980) was a British novelist and playwright.

His reputation rests on his first memoir Bang to Rights (1958) and his musical play Fings Ain't Wot They Used T'Be (1960), but much of the remainder of his work remains fresh and readable. Norman's early success was based in part on the frankness of his memoirs and in part on the style of his writing, which contained both renditions of cockney speakers and his own poor spelling. Jeffrey Bernard in an obituary of Norman wrote that he was

"a 'natural' writer of considerable wit, powers of sardonic observation and with a razor sharp ear for dialogue particularly as spoken in the underworld."

Early life

Norman was born in Bristol, England, in 1930 and was abandoned by his natural parents. After an unsuccessful adoption, he was committed to a succession of children's homes in and around London—the story of which is recounted in his childhood autobiography, Banana Boy (1969). After the homes came a succession of petty crimes for which he was imprisoned, finally leading to a three-year stretch at Camp Hill Prison on the Isle of Wight.

John Norman was not born within the sound of Bow Bells so was not a true Cockney sparrow. He was born on 9 June 1930, the illegitimate son of Frank Charles Booth and Beatrice Smith Née Norman, a secretary who worked at the engineering works owned by Frank Smith's father. The place of birth was given as 151 Whiteladies Road, Clifton, Bristol. John was abandoned by his mother some years later and was placed with The Church of England Adoption society. After a few unsuccessful adoptions John was placed with a wealthy women who it is recorded had servants who looked after Master John. It was thought it was about this time his name got changed around while living with Lady W as he calls her. This adoption did not work out, so Frank was placed in the care of Dr Barnardo's on 24 March 1937 at Stepney HQ where he stayed for a short time. Frank was then moved to Cardington Abbey Howard House 17 Cardington Road, Bedford on 3 April 1937. This is recorded as a home for children with learning disabilities. One of his teachers wrote, "This lad will never amount to much." How wrong she was.

At Howard House, Bedford Frank had started to settle down but soon found it was time to move to another home, and on 21 August 1941 Frank ended up at Kingston-upon-Thame s, which by all accounts was not a happy time for Frank. On 8 July 1944 he set off for Goldings together with several other boys, which for him turned out to be the most fearsome establishment, recounted in his childhood autobiography Banana Boy (1969). This time at Goldings would stand him in good stead during the time he would spend on "holiday" in prison.

While at Goldings, he tried a few trades but could not master any, most likely due to his limited reading and writing skills, so he ended up in the kitchen. He then requested a transfer to the gardening department. He left Goldings aged 16 on 17 October 1946.

After leaving Dr. Barnardo's, Frank was involved in petty crimes for which he was imprisoned, finally leading to a three-year stretch at Camp Hill Prison on the Isle of Wight.

Writing career
Released from prison in 1957, he started writing what was to become his best known book. Norman's several accounts of how he came to write are at variance with one another, but within a year of his release, he had published in Encounter magazine a 10,000-word extract from his prison memoir, Bang to Rights. Championed at first by the editor of Encounter, Stephen Spender, and subsequently by Raymond Chandler, who wrote the foreword to Bang to Rights, Norman's literary success was assured.

After the success of Bang to Rights Norman wrote a draft of what was to become the musical Fings Ain't Wot They Used T'Be. This draft found its way to Joan Littlewood who produced it for the Theatre Workshop at the Theatre Royal, Stratford, with Lionel Bart writing the music for the songs. The play transferred to the West End, and Norman won the Evening Standard Drama Award for best musical in 1960.

Around the same period Norman was writing Stand on Me, an autobiographical memoir of his life in Soho in the 1950s before imprisonment. His next book The Guntz was a follow-up to Bang to Rights, relating stories from his life as a successful writer. Soho Night and Day (1966) was a collaboration with Jeffrey Bernard whose photographs enlivened Norman's text. Two novels followed in quick succession: The Monkey Pulled His Hair in 1967 and Barney Snip – Artist (1968).

Later work
A further novel, Dodgem Greaser, published in 1971, contained the fictionalised memoirs of a fairground boy, certainly based on Norman's own boyhood fairground experiences.

Norman's London reprinted a selection of Norman's early journalism, while Lock'em up and Count'em provides an appraisal of and a plan of reform for the British prison system. The Penguin collection The Lives of Frank Norman (1972) contains extracts from four of his previously published autobiographical books. A further memoir Why Fings Went West (1975) deals specifically with theatre life in the late 1950s and early 1960s. His last published work of non-fiction was The Fake's Progress written in collaboration with its subject Tom Keating, the art forger, and his wife Geraldine Norman, whom he married in 1971.

Norman's novels of the 1970s lacked some of the power of his earlier work. One of our Own is a rambling novel of East End life; Much Ado About Nuffink (1974), is a semi-autobiographical novel of a working-class playwright whose play Who Do They Fink They're 'Aving A Go At, Then becomes a critical success. Down and Out in High Society (1975) is a novel about Soho.

Three late novels—Too Many Crooks Spoil the Caper (1979), The Dead Butler Caper (1980) and The Baskerville Caper (1981)—found Norman back in strong form in a series featuring Ed Nelson, an under-employed Soho private detective with a penchant for Hankey Bannister Scotch whisky.

In 1960, Frank Norman appeared as a contestant on the TV game show "To Tell the Truth". He was an impostor pretending to be British long-distance runner Fred Norris. The host, Bud Collier, acknowledged Norman's writing career by letting the audience know his prize-winning play Fings Ain't Wot They Used T'Be had been playing in London's West End for 14 months.

Death
Frank Norman died of Hodgkin's lymphoma aged 50, on 23 December 1980.

General Works
Bang to Rights (1958)
Stand on Me (1960)
The Guntz (1962)
Soho Night and Day (1966)
The Monkey Pulled His Hair (1967)
Barney Snip – Artist (1968)
Banana Boy (1969)
Norman's London (1969)
Lock'em up and Count'em (1970)
Dodgem Greaser (1971)
The Lives of Frank Norman (1972)
One of our Own (1973)
Much Ado About Nuffink (1974)
Why Fings Went West (1975)
Down and Out in High Society (1975)
The Fake's Progress (1977) (with Tom Keating and Geraldine Norman)
Too Many Crooks Spoil the Caper (1979)
The Dead Butler Caper (1980)
The Baskerville Caper (1981)

Plays
Fings Ain't Wot They Used T'Be (1959)
A Kayf Up West (1964)
Insideout (1969)
Costa Packet

References

Jeffrey Bernard, "Mr Frank Norman", The Times, 28 December 1980.

External links 
 

1930 births
1980 deaths
20th-century British novelists
20th-century British dramatists and playwrights
British male novelists
British male dramatists and playwrights
People from Clifton, Bristol